Edward Digby, 2nd Earl Digby (6 January 1773 – 12 May 1856), known as Viscount Coleshill from 1790 to 1793, was a British peer.

Digby was the eldest son of Henry Digby, 1st Earl Digby, and Mary Knowler. He succeeded his father in the earldom in 1793 and was able to take his seat in the House of Lords on his twenty-first birthday the following year. Lord Digby is most notable for serving as Lord Lieutenant of Dorset for nearly fifty years, from 1808 to 1856. On 20 May 1824, he appointed himself Colonel of the Dorset Militia. He resigned the colonelcy at the beginning of 1846. He never married and on his death in May 1856, aged 83, the viscountcy and earldom became extinct. However, he was succeeded in the two baronies of Digby by his first cousin once removed Edward Digby, who became the 9th and 3rd Baron.

Notes

References
Kidd, Charles, Williamson, David (editors). Debrett's Peerage and Baronetage (1990 edition). New York: St Martin's Press, 1990.

|-

1773 births
1856 deaths
Lord-Lieutenants of Dorset
British Militia officers
Edward
Edward